Margreid an der Weinstraße, often abbreviated to Margreid or Magrè, is a comune (municipality) in South Tyrol in northern Italy, located about  southwest of the city of Bolzano.

Margreid borders the following municipalities: Kurtatsch, Kurtinig, Neumarkt, Roverè della Luna and Salorno.

Coat-of-arms
The emblem is party per fess, of gules and sable, with an or horn. It is the arms of the family Ob der Platten who lived in the village until 1511. The emblem, which was adopted in 1968, appeared as a seal in 1780.

Linguistic distribution
According to the 2011 census, 84.33% of the population speak German, 15.22% Italian and 0.45% Ladin as first language.

References

External links

 Official website 

Municipalities of South Tyrol
Nonsberg Group